Miaow is the fourth album by The Beautiful South. It was released in 1994 via GO! Discs.

As with most Beautiful South albums, the songs were written by Dave Rotheray and Paul Heaton. The songs reflect a depressing period in Heaton's life, and this continues with the follow-up album Blue is the Colour. The best example of this on the album is the opening track "Hold on to What?", which could be interpreted as an attack on the ruling classes, this is most evident at the end of the song where Heaton sings 'Chamberlain had his paper, Jesus had his cross, They held on, We held on to what?' 

The songs also led the South's first female singer, Briana Corrigan, to leave the band; after Heaton sent her copies of the songs, including "Mini-correct" and "Worthless Lie", she swiftly made the decision to leave. Equally swiftly, Heaton employed the then-unknown Jacqui Abbott in her place, who went on to appear on every album up to Painting It Red.

The cover originally depicted a lot of dogs seated in a music hall with a gramophone on the stage. However, HMV made the band withdraw it as it mocked their trademark dog, and the band put out a second cover, depicting four dogs in a boat. Both paintings were created by Michael Sowa.

It reached number 6 in the album charts, and had three singles released from it.
Norman Cook, former band member of The Housemartins with Paul Heaton, is credited in the sleeve notes as doing the "Programming on Hooligans" (track 7). The song later appeared on The Beautiful Game, the various artists UEFA Euro 1996 tie-in album.

Singles 
Good As Gold –  released: February 1994 chart position: 23
Everybody's Talkin' –  released: May 1994, chart position: 12
Prettiest Eyes –  released: August 1994, chart position: 37

Track listing
All songs written by Paul Heaton and Dave Rotheray, except where noted.

"Hold On to What?"
"Good as Gold (Stupid as Mud)”
"Especially for You"
"Everybody's Talkin'" (Fred Neil)
"Prettiest Eyes"
"Worthless Lie"
"Hooligans Don't Fall in Love"
"Hidden Jukebox"
"Hold Me Close (Underground)"
"Tattoo"
"Mini-Correct"
"Poppy"

CD Single/CDEP B-Sides
As was their usual modus operandi, The Beautiful South included unreleased material on the B-sides of the singles taken from their albums.

from the "Good As Gold" CD1
"Good As Gold (Stupid As Mud)"
"Love Adjourned"
"Minicorrect" (Demo Version )

from the "Good As Gold" CD2
"Good As Gold (Stupid As Mud)" 
"Frank And Delores" (M.G. Greaves)
"One Man's Rubbish" (Klivington/Greaves)

from the "Everybody's Talkin'" (Fred Neil) CD1
"Everybody's Talkin'" (single version)
"A Way With The Blues" (M.G. Greaves)
"Let Love Speak Up Itself" (Recorded for the Emma Freud Show, Radio One, March 1994) 	

from the "Everybody's Talkin'" (Fred Neil) CD2
"Everybody's Talkin'" (LP/CD version)
"Nearer To God" (M.G. Greaves)
"A Piece Of Sky" (M.G. Greaves)

from the "Prettiest Eyes" CD1
"Prettiest Eyes"
"The Best We Can"
”Size” (this is a longer version of 5:40 later edited to 3:24, using an earlier fade-out on the instrumental for the limited edition bonus disc of Carry on up the Charts)

from the "Prettiest Eyes" CD2
"Prettiest Eyes"
"Why Can't I" (M.G. Greaves)
"Missing Her Now" (M.G. Greaves)

Personnel

Paul Heaton – vocals
Dave Hemingway – vocals
Jacqui Abbott – vocals
Dave Rotheray – guitar
Sean Welch – bass
Dave Stead – drums

with:
Damon Butcher – keyboards
Martin Ditcham – percussion

References

1994 albums
The Beautiful South albums
Albums produced by Jon Kelly
Go! Discs albums